Lake Azulcocha (possibly from Spanish azul, blue; and Quechua qucha, lake) is a lake in the Pariacaca mountain range in the Andes of Peru. It is located in the Junín Region, Jauja Province, Canchayllo District. It lies northwest of Pariacaca, the highest mountain of the range. The lake belongs to the watershed of the Mantaro River. 

It is operated by Electroperu.

See also
List of lakes in Peru

References

Lakes of Peru
Lakes of Junín Region
Dams in Peru
Buildings and structures in Junín Region